Tower Gardens in North Tottenham is a distinctive semi-circular estate bounded by Lordship Lane and the Roundway. Constructed between 1904 and 1928, it was one of the first municipal "cottage estates" in the world. It is now a conservation area and is featured in the annual London Open City architecture weekend held third weekend in September. Originally known as the White Hart Lane Estate, Tower Gardens was built by the London County Council (LCC) using powers granted to local authorities by the Housing of the Working Classes Act 1900.  Samuel Montagu, 1st Baron Swaythling donated £10,000 for the purchase of the land on which it was built.  The donation was tied to the rehousing of Jewish workers resident in the Tower Hamlets parish, and required an area of land to be set aside for public gardens: hence the name Tower Gardens.  Tower Gardens was also the first LCC estate to be built outside the LCC area.

Context

The Conservation Area comprises the oldest parts of the estate, built by the London County Council between 1904 and 1913. It is one of the first "garden suburbs" in the world and is characterised by good quality and practical buildings that show an inventive use of materials and vernacular motifs typical of the Arts and Crafts Movement. Along with Hampstead Garden Suburb, Tower Gardens is one of the most important estates of its type in London.

The estate consists of 954 houses arranged in 24 streets, each with its own architectural style. Their appearance was influenced by the Garden City Movement founded by Sir Ebenezer Howard.

The properties are mostly two-up, two-down with some three bed houses and also flats in Topham Square. The houses remain cheap by London standards.

The curiously named streets belie the area's history. Most appear to be named after someone who once owned the land, from Siward, Earl of Northumberland, in the time of Edward the Confessor, through to Thomas Smith in 1792. A project by Risley Avenue School in conjunction with Bruce Castle Museum identified the streets as named after the "Lords of Tottenham".

Architecture 
The terraced houses in N17 are small and were not expensively built but they have many small architectural features which differ with every street. They are predominantly brick, tile and pebble dash cottages in a style that owes something to the Arts and Crafts movement of the time. Construction was under the architect W. E. Riley, a member of the Art Workers Guild. The façades change all over the estate and in places terraces of four houses were designed to look like country mansions.

Features of interest include the gables, gable dormers, impressive chimneys, long roofs, low eaves, porches and two story projecting bays. Images can be found in the Conway Library's online collection.

Earlier houses are small and have front doors opening into the single reception room. When they were built they would have had outside toilets. Tin baths were a common feature due to the lack of bathrooms. Later houses benefited from new legislation and have front doors opening onto a hall with stairs and often a second reception room.

Influence of the Garden Suburb 
Whilst the design of the estate was influenced by the Garden City Movement, the grid layout of the lower half of the estate was not entirely in the tradition of the garden suburbs, nor was the density of housing. However some houses were set back behind small greens and a large green area was provided for recreation including tennis and bowls. The trees lining the streets are protected and provide a boulevard feel, particularly Risley Avenue, privet hedges to the front fascia of the properties within the conservation area are protected.

References

External links
 "A life in the day of a Tower Gardens resident"
 "Tower Gardens – Tottenham's Garden Suburb"
 "Tower Gardens N17": Tower Gardens Residents group (former Tower Gardens Network)

Buildings and structures in Tottenham